Wettstetten is a municipality  in the district of Eichstätt in Bavaria in Germany.

Mayors
Gerd Risch was elected mayor in 2014, and re-elected in 2020. He is the successor of Hans Mödl.

References

Eichstätt (district)